Marklund Motorsport, also competed under the title Volkswagen Marklund Motorsport, is an auto racing team.  The team has been competing in rallycross since its creation, and has recently been backed by Volkswagen. For 2016 the team merged with Kristoffersson Motorsport to create Volkswagen RX Sweden, before stepping back to the European circuit following the fallout from the Volkswagen emissions scandal.

Racing record

Complete FIA World Rallycross Championship results
(key)

Supercar

† Points scored with other team(s).

Complete FIA European Rallycross Championship results
(key)

Touringcar

Supercar

* Season still in progress.

External links

 
 

Swedish auto racing teams
World Rallycross Championship teams
Global RallyCross Championship teams
Auto racing teams established in 2011